Glacier Bay Basin in southeastern Alaska, in the United States, encompasses the Glacier Bay and surrounding mountains and glaciers, which was first proclaimed a U.S. National Monument on February 25, 1925, and which was later, on December 2, 1980, enlarged and designated as the Glacier Bay National Park and Preserve under the Alaska National Interest Lands Conservation Act, covering an area of . In 1986, UNESCO declared an area of  within a World Biosphere Reserve. This is the largest UNESCO protected biosphere in the world. Part of the National Park is also designated a Wilderness area covering .

Current glaciers cover an area  and accounts for 27% of the Park area. Up until the early 1700s the area was a large single glacier of solid ice. It has since retreated and evolved into the largest protected water area park in the world. Over the last 200 years the glaciers have retreated, exposing  of ocean, and in this process left 20 separate other glaciers in its trail. In 1890, the name "Glacier Bay" as such was given to the bay by Captain Lester A. Beardslee of the U.S. Navy. It was first proclaimed a U.S. National Monument on February 25, 1925, by President Calvin Coolidge.

The Glacier Bay has many branches, inlets, lagoons, islands, and channels that holds prospects for scientific exploration and visual treat. Thus, the area is popular as a cruise ship destination during summer season. However, there are restrictions imposed by the National Park Service on the numbers of vessels that can operate in a day to 2 cruise ships, 3 tour boats, 6 charter vessels, and 25 private vessels. The bay received an average of about 443,975 recreational visitors annually from 2012 to 2021, with 89,768 visitors in 2021. According to a tourism score, the best time to visit Glacier Bay National Park and Preserve is from mid July to mid August for activities in warm weather.

History

Geologists believe that Glacier Bay existed during a minimum of four Glacial periods ending with the Little Ice Age, which has a 4,000-year-old record, as the latest period. All glaciers in the park today are said to be remnants of this glacial period.

The earliest recorded history of the Glacier Bay area starts with the 1741 Russian expedition of Vitus Bering and Aleksei Chirikov. La Perouse (after whom one of the glaciers in the bay was named subsequently) established contact with the local inhabitants, the Tlingits at Lutya Bay, in 1786, though traditionally the Tlingit lived in the area before the last glacial advance forced them out. This was followed by the Russians staking their claim to the region.

In 1794, Joseph Whidbey, master of the Discovery during George Vancouver's 1791–95 expedition, reported that his exploration of this part of the coast was blocked by a wall of  width and ) thick. Vancouver claimed the land for Britain in conflict with an earlier Russian claim, which was resolved by the Anglo-Russian Convention of 1825. The United States purchased Alaska from the Russians in 1867 with a claim under that treaty of owning all lands up to "the summit of the mountains situated parallel to the coast". The United States and Canada agreed that an arbitration board would draw the exact boundary. The arbitration award given in 1903 resolved the Alaska boundary dispute by drawing a line that linked the mountain peaks in this area. Because the agreement froze the exact boundary in 1903, further retreat of the glacier does not alter the boundary as the coast extends northward. As a result, the northern edge of Tarr Inlet is approaching the boundary.

With the discovery of gold in the area, gold rush brought miners to the area. In 1890, Willoughby Island in Glacier Bay was the scene of a meeting of the miners, which was followed by the establishment of the Berry mining district. In the 1890s, a salt mine was established at Bartlett Cove. Fox farms and a cannery were also established; however, the cannery was abandoned in 1935.

John Muir, the naturalist, conservationist and scientist, pioneered the focus of the world on the Glacier Bay phenomenon. During his research Muir had witnessed the glaciers in action. He had noted that the ice had retreated almost all the way up.

In 1899, wealthy railroad magnate Edward Harriman arranged for a maritime expedition called the Harriman Alaska Expedition to Alaska comprising an elite community of scientists, artists, photographers, and naturalists to explore and document the Alaskan coast. The voyagers, spent two months traveling from Seattle, along the coast of Alaska, to Siberia, and back again. In many ways, the expedition was an intersection of 19th-century science and 20th-century science. The expedition claimed to have discovered some 600 species that were new to science, including 38 new fossil species. They charted the geographic distribution of many species. They discovered an unmapped fiord and named several glaciers. John Muir and his friend Harriman who were members of this expedition were instrumental in governmental lobbying on National Park legislation says. The Harriman expedition was instrumental in documenting the extent of the glacier's retreat in 1899.

John Muir was seeking corroboration of the continental glaciation theories of Louis Agassiz, whose controversial Etudes sur les Glaciers was published in 1840. The year 1893 recorded the arrival of the first tourist ship at the entrance to the Bay, at Bartlett Cove, which over the years has become central to the tourist trade in the Glacier Bay. This is the fastest documented glacial retreat ever. In 1925, Glacier Bay was declared a national monument.

For centuries, the Glacier Bay has been the home land of the Huna Tlingit native tribes of Alaska. Their oral traditions indicate being displaced by the last advance of the glacier. They continue to be part of the Bay residents and it is woven into the "tapestry of their lives".

Geography

Glacier Bay is subsumed within the larger about  National Park and Preserve. The preserve, which is a spectacular ensemble of marine and terrestrial life, is delimited by: The Tongass National Forest borders on the east and north east; by the international boundary with Tatshenshini-Alsek Wilderness Provincial Park in British Columbia, Canada on the north; by the waters of Cross Sound and Icy Strait border on the south; and by the Pacific Ocean on the west. When President Calvin Coolidge declared the Glacial Bay to be a national monument, in 1925, the objective clearly stated was:

The Alaska National Interest Lands Conservation Act of 1980 changed its status to a National Park and Reserve covering an area of  including  as a preserve: However, have been declared as Wilderness.

The Glacier Bay Basin is now a myriad combination of tidewater glaciers, snow-capped mountain ranges, ocean coastlines, deep fjords, and freshwater rivers and lakes that provide widely varying land and seascape and "hosts a mosaic of plant communities and a variety of marine and terrestrial wildlife."

There are over 50 named glaciers (both tidewater and terrestrial glaciers); 10 tide water glaciers – one on the east arm of the bay and all others on the west arm reach shorelines and calved) (literal meaning: "breaking off") to produce icebergs. Seven of these glaciers are reported to be active tidewater glaciers, which depict the  calving phenomenon, which means that they  break into icebergs and fall into the sea with thundering noise raising large waves.

It covers a coastline of  including some reach of the coast outside the Bay. Glacier Bay Basin as such has a coast line of  including all islands; the coast line without counting islands accounts for statute .

According to the recorded findings, most glaciers are retreating except the Johns Hopkins Glacier, which is advancing and the Margerie Glacier which is stable. The glacier thinning or retreating process is attributed to lesser incidence of snowfall on the hills, raising temperatures in the winter season followed by decrease in cloud cover and precipitation during the summer season.

Post Little Ice Age Rebound in the Glacier Bay Basin has been studied by researchers of the Geophysical Institute, University of Alaska Fairbanks, Alaska in association with National Park and Preserve Service, under a National Science Foundation grant using GPS geodesy combined with studies of raised shorelines and tide gauges. The studies have established that the fastest rates of glacier rebound in the world are now taking place in the Glacier Bay region. The studies have also reported that "these adjustments to LIA loading and unloading are producing significant stresses on the earth's crust which can affect seismicity and regional tectonics. The rising land also is continually changing the geomorphic texture of shoreline throughout the Park and causing changes in hydrologic patterns, erosion, and sedimentation. All these changes have a direct impact on the ecosystems of the Park."

Glacier Bay can be approached only by boats or ships and partly by hiking along three trails and by kayaking along ) of shore line. The nearest road head and airport are in the small town of Gustavus, which is known as the southern gateway to the Glacier Bay. However, Gustavus as such is approachable only by air and sea. Juneau, the capital of Alaska, is about ).

The advancing and retreating characteristics of the glaciers in the Glacier Bay are explained in simple terms as a steady state of snow getting converted into ice on the hills. Ice, as a lens of water on the base of bedrock, slides by gravity downwards. The good moraine of rock and rubble insulates it from water erosion. As a result, during freezing temperatures that exists all the year, the glacier advances. When the insulation and erosion effect of the hills gets reduced erosion sets in and along with rising temperatures the glaciers start retreating. Another unpredictable phenomenon that is observed in many glaciers in the Glacier Bay is that of calving. Calving is a process in which blocks of ice get detached or break off from the glacier, irrespective of weather conditions, all the year round, and crash into the sea with thundering noise creating a boiling like turbulence.

The Glacier Bay was closed for ships almost a decade after the 1899 earthquake (magnitude 8.4 on the Richter Scale). This was on account of the shattered ice blocks which filled the Bay consequent to the earthquake. Even though the Bay is in volcanic activity region of the Pacific "Rim of Fire", active volcanoes have not been recorded within the Glacier Bay Basin. However, these two factors have been inferred to have effects on the environmental changes occurring in the Glacier Bay.

Archeological findings
Archaeological findings have been unearthed at two sites in the Glacier Bay, which links the region to Holocene period. On the Baranoff Island, a prehistoric finding dates occupation of the region between 3200 and 4600 BP. Another finding in the form of a house, microlithic tools and heavy wood working tools at Ground Hog Bay has been dated to about 2000 BP. This is stated to be "towards the end of the Hypsithermal (thermal maximum climatic fluctuation) and the beginning of the Little Ice Age". Thus, it has been interpreted by comparison with similarly placed locations in the region, such as the southern coast of British Columbia, that the type of culture seen here is comparable to the culture that existed during historic times on the Northwest Coast. The potential for finding more such sites are stated to be high.

Ethnographic aspects

The Tlingits regard Glacier Bay as their sacred homeland. The National Park Service takes the view that "Glacier Bay National Park is the spiritual homeland of the Huna Tlingit, and Glacier Bay National Preserve is the homeland of the Ghunaaxhoo Kwaan unit of the Yakutat Tlingit Tribe". The tribes' oral history supports that they were pushed out and migrated south when the glacier advanced. They moved back to the area when the Glacier retreated in the 1880s. There are 60 odd proto-historic or historic sites in the Glacier Bay, which are identified with Tlingit Indians or European Americans. They are an integral part of Northwest Coast people inferred to be belonging to Haida, Tlingit or Eyak clans. Their settlements existed even in the 1880s in Dry Bay, Excursion Inlet, Point Couverden and the Port Frederick area (now known as Hoonah) and Dundas Bay. A Tlingit cemetery of the period has also been located in the park area. Seasonal hunting, gathering and fishing was their way of life, woven around a central village, with shifting fishing and hunting camps. The food source of the natives was the rich Salmon fish resources of the area. A complex society evolved with rich artistic traditions. Tlingits claimed their fishing-dependent lifestyle was helped during the National Monument years, which kept out commercial fishing. After the area became a National Park, their fishing and hunting activities were curtailed except for certain religious exemptions. However, the National Park administration is closely interacting with the Tlingits to foster their cultural heritage. They are allowed access to the park to "harvest berries, a variety of seafoods, and traditional use items such as spruce roots and mountain goat hair (for weaving traditional blankets)". In addition the park is planning to establish a Tlingit longhouse near its main office, where Tlingit culture would be fully highlighted and also facilitate holding of cultural events.

Climate
The bay has a cool wet, coastal temperate rainforest climate. Three climatic zones have been discerned in the Glacier Bay; the outer coast along the Gulf of Alaska, which records mild temperatures and higher precipitation. However, it experiences less snowfall, the upper Glacier Bay where it is much colder and heavy snowfall occurs, and the lower Glacier Bay, which experiences heavy rainfall throughout the year.

Annual precipitation is in the form of rainfall and snowfall.

Flora and fauna

The environment of Glacier Bay has been categorized under four main land ecosystems namely, the wet tundra, the coastal western hemlock/Sitka spruce forest, the alpine tundra, and the glaciers and ice fields; within the Bay proper, further break up into three major marine ecosystems are marked namely, "within in and around continental shelf, wave-beaten coasts, and fjord estuaries."

Plants progressively moved in as the glacier retreated, so a 200-year-old spruce and hemlock forest presently exists at the entrance, grading up to more primitive plants such as mosses and lichens at the head of the bay. Because of current local climate change some glaciers are now retreating at a rate of up to a quarter of a mile per year.

The retreat of the glaciers exposed land areas and as a result "Plant communities and animal populations ranging from "pioneer species" in areas recently exposed by receding glaciers to climax communities in older coastal and alpine ecosystems" have emerged.

Wild life
In general, wild life in Glacier Bay, has been identified under aqua fauna, avifauna and fauna; 160 marine and estuarine fish species, 242 bird species and 41 species of mammals have been recorded.

Bears

Bears, both black and brown, are seen in Glacier Bay in the intertidal zone which they frequent for foraging. They are also seen "scraping barnacles off of rocks and munching mussels." Invariably they are spotted wandering alone along the beaches of the Glacier Bay in search of salmon. The habitats of the black bears are generally the southern forested areas of the bay. However, the brown bears are mostly found in the northern, more recently glaciated zones of the Glacier Bay. Occasionally, black bears are sighted near the glaciers or near Gustavus town. Black bears with black dots and brown bears with brown dots have been seen over the last 10 years. Their travel routes have been identified as along the easy tracks such as along beaches, stream beds and river valleys. The most commonly identified locations for sighting bears in the Glacier Bay are: The Bartlett Cove, the Bartlett River, the Beardslee Islands and North and South Sandy Cove locations for black bears, while brown bears are seen to the north of Tidal Inlet in the west arm of glacier and north of Adams Inlet in the east arm. They are also seen swimming in the Bay, crossing from one bank to the other. Salmon are their favorite food, apart from bumblebees, sand fleas, bird eggs, birds, voles and marine mammal carcasses.

Whale

Humpback whales have been sighted in the lower region of Glacier Bay; also in Sitakaday Narrows, Whidbey Passage and the waters around South Marble Island. For kayakers, Hugh Miller Inlet and the Beardslee Islands are good locations to see humpback whales from a safe distance of about a quarter mile. Other marine whales sighted are grey, minke, fin, and killer whales (orcas).

Seals and porpoise
Harbor seals, northern fur seals, sea otters, harbor porpoises, Dall's porpoises and Steller sea lions are also seen in Glacier Bay.

Other fauna
Land mammals sighted in Glacier Bay are: blue bears (glacier), moose, Sitka black-tailed deer, mountain goat, wolf, coyote, lynx, wolverine, marmots, land and river otters, weasels, ermine, mink, squirrels, beaver and red fox. Porcupines, voles, shrews, hares, and bats are also found.

Avifauna

200 species of birds have been recorded in the Bay. These include: the bald eagle, golden eagle, raven, northern hawk owl, sandhill crane, loon, Steller's jay, murre, cormorant, puffin, murrelet, oystercatchers, herons, geese, ducks, ptarmigan, crow, osprey, blue grouse, woodpecker, pigeon guillemot, sparrow, sandpiper, plover, Arctic tern, kittiwake and gulls.

Fish
Fish species found in the bay are: Chinook, chum, sockeye, pink and coho salmon, halibut, trout, steelhead, Dolly Varden, lingcod, whitefish, blackfish, char and herring. As for shellfish, there are Dungeness crabs, scallops, shrimp and clams.  Salmon are very important food of bears, particularly in the late summer and fall. In the southern part of the bay, there are streams which abound in salmon. They are also seen colonizing in the northern bay, consequent to the retreat of many glaciers and the streams emerging. These salmon food sources are expected to support more bear populations in the years ahead.

Vegetation
Plant recolonization and succession has occurred in Glacier Bay as a result of the retreat of the glacier bay in the last about 300 years. The succession, which occurred in the new wilderness of Glacier Bay, started on the raw landscape. The Park is now home to the longest running successional study in the world, started in 1916 by William S. Cooper. A simile given is that "It was like seeing an owl with no feathers". A vegetative wilderness has been created, which has resulted in the coastal forest. 333 Vascular plant species of individual taxa have been recorded in the Glacier Bay. Dense thickets of Sitka alder and devil's club abound along the shoreline.

Landmarks

There are 50 odd glaciers identified in the Glacier Bay, which are both terrestrial and tidewater type. Some of the major inlets, glaciers and the mountains in the order of their location from the entry have been identified from the National Park Service Map. At the entry to the Bay there are (as read from the map): The small Gustavus town and then the Visitor Center of the National Park Service and the Glacier Bay Lodge followed by several islands within the main channel. On the western side of the channel, the first inlet is the Muir Inlet which has several inlets and glaciers such as Adam's Inlet, Casement Glacier, McBride Glacier, Riggs Glacier, Muir Glacier followed by the Wachusett Inlet. Coming out of the Muir inlet and entering and cruising toward the north along the main Bay, on the west shore are the Gelkie Inlet, Reid Glacier and Lamplugh Glacier fed by Brady Ice field and Brady Glacier, followed by Johns Hopkins Glacier, Margerie Glacier and the Great Pacific Glacier at the head of the Bay. The east shore line has the Queen Inlet with its Carroll Glacier, and the Rendu Inlet with its Rendu Glacier. The Fairweather Range of hills which feeds the Johns Hopkins and Margerie Glaciers form the western boundary of the Glacier Bay and the highest mountains seen here are the Mt. Fairweather, Mt. Quincy Adams, Mt. Salisbury, Mt. Crillon, Mt. Bertha, Mt. Abbe and Mt. Cooper. The major island, opposite to the Johns Hopkins Inlet, is the Russel Island in the midst of the main channel.

Muir Glacier

The Muir Glacier was named after John Muir, the naturalist, who identified it in 1889. It has now turned into terrestrial glacier; it has receded and does not flow into the sea. Its retreat has been very rapid and well-documented since its Little Ice Age maximum position at the mouth of Glacier Bay around 1780. During its retreating stage which began in 1889, calving was intense. Morse Glacier is its tributary and is also retreating faster than the Muir.

Reid Glacier

The Reid Glacier was named by the members of the Harriman Alaska Expedition for Harry Fielding Reid (1859–1944), professor of geology at Johns Hopkins University, who was well known for his studies of glacier flow and stratification in Alaska and the Alps. In view of fast rate of retreat, this glacier has turned from tide water to terrestrial glacier, particularly on its eastern and western one third widths. Sediment deposits from the glacier have gradually filled the eastern and western margins at its inlet, as seen during low tides. The walls of the fjord of the glacier, however, also show marks of lateral deposits of the glaciers right up to rock faces.

Lamplugh Glacier

The Lamplugh Glacier was named by Lawrence Martin of the U.S. Geological Survey (USGS) around 1912 for the English geologist George William Lamplugh (1859–1926), who visited the Glacier Bay in 1884. The Glacier originates in the Brady Icefield to the east of Fairweather Range. In the central part, a subglacial stream has developed which is seen to shift its position laterally. This phenomenon is attributed to the deposition of fluvial sediment in the embayment. It forms a delta, as observed during low tide. It also results in water turning from brown to tan milky.

Johns Hopkins Inlet

All these glaciers are tidewater glaciers. Ice blocks float in the inlet and it is quite hazardous for boating or kayaking; both activities have to be done with great caution. Johns Hopkins Inlet is closed to boats in May and June in order to protect unweaned harbor seal pups.

Johns Hopkins Glacier

Its rock, ice and snow depict a variety of impressive colors such as grey, blue and white. It was named in 1893 by H.F. Reid after the Johns Hopkins University in Baltimore, Maryland, which sponsored an expedition to this glacier. Submarine calving has also been recorded.

Most visitors to the park come by cruise ship and thus view the glaciers from the water.

Gilman Glacier

Gilman Glacier got attached to Johns Hopkins Glacier sometime in 1990. In the following decade, the two glaciers merged and de-merged several times. However, in 2000 it was again attached to Johns Hopkins glacier and the two together are stated to be advancing along the  steep ice face.

Tarr Inlet
The Tarr Inlet at the head of the Glacier Bay is a scene of ice and snow, and "sits cater-corner to Johns Hopkins Inlet". This inlet provides excellent views of the Grand Pacific Glacier to its north and the Margerie Glacier to its west. The west shore line of this inlet is steep and rocky, extends to  up to a small stream where a beach has been formed. A further  along the channel, a glacier knob is seen in the center of the west shore of the inlet. A cove formation here provides for good camping grounds, where strong winds and ice flows are experienced. This location also provides a panoramic view of the Tarr Inlet. Two miles north of this location is the Margerie Glacier. Grand Pacific Glacier is located to the east side of the Margerie Glacier at the head of the Tarr Inlet where extensive gravel outwash is seen.

Margerie Glacier

It was named for famed French geographer and geologist Emmanuel de Margerie (1862–1953), who visited Glacier Bay in 1913. Mount Root (elevation ), named Boundary Peak 165, is a mountain in Alaska and British Columbia, is part of the Fairweather Range of the Saint Elias Mountains.

Grand Pacific Glacier

The Grand Pacific Glacier, at the head of the Tarr Inlet on the north, has a streaked face covered with gravel and stones (more than ) thick in many areas). Landslides and medial moraines cover much of eastern side of the glacier extending to about two-thirds width of the ice face. It is not an active glacier. In the earlier 18th century, it was a one single block of ice at the Gulf of Alaska, when Captain Vancouver first saw it, which has receded to the present location that is ) from the Glacier Bay inlet. At the present site, Grand Pacific Glacier has a width of ) with a water depth of ) and with an average height of ) and stretches to ). It calves into the Tarr Inlet and its western two thirds part is formed by the tributary Ferris Glacier. Its flow rate is reported to be about ) per year or about ) per day. However, the eastern part of the Glacier is reportedly moving at the rate of about ) per year. Margerie Glacier had merged with this glacier in 1992. As the glacier started receding it got demerged from Margerie and only a small stream separates the two glaciers now.

Fairweather Range

The Fairweather Range is the unofficial name for a mountain range located in the U.S. state of Alaska and the Canadian province of British Columbia. It is the southernmost range of the Saint Elias Mountains. The northernmost section of the range is situated in Tatshenshini-Alsek Provincial Park while the southernmost section resides in Glacier Bay National Park in the Hoonah-Angoon Census Area. In between, it goes through the southeastern corner of Yakutat Borough. Peaks of this range include Mount Fairweather, the highest point in British Columbia and Mount Quincy Adams .

Between the bay and the coast, snow-clad peaks of the Fairweather Range capture the moisture coming in off the Gulf of Alaska and, in turn, spawn the park's largest glaciers. Mt. Fairweather is the tallest peak in the Fairweather Range and is very much unlike its name as it has a very harsh terrain.

Mt. Fairweather

While most of the mountain lies within the City and Borough of Yakutat, the summit is also in Tatshenshini-Alsek Provincial Park, British Columbia (Canada), making it the highest point in that province. It is also designated as Boundary Peak 164 or as US/Canada Boundary Point #164. The mountain was named on May 3, 1778, by Captain James Cook,  apparently for the unusually good weather encountered at the time. The name has been variously translated. It was called "Mt. Beautemps" by La Perouse (1786, atlas), "Mte. Buen-tiempo" by Galiano (1802, map 3), "Gor[a]-Khoroshy-pogody" on Russian Hydrographic Service Chart 1378 in 1847, and "G[ora] Fayerveder" by Captain Tebenkov (1852, map 7), Imperial Russian Navy. It was called "Schonwetterberg" by Constantin Grewink in 1850 and "Schonwetter Berg" by Justus Perthes in 1882. Mt. Fairweather was first climbed in 1931 by Allen Carpé and Terris Moore.

References

External links

Map of National Park Service

Bays of Alaska
Bays of Hoonah–Angoon Census Area, Alaska
Glacier Bay National Park and Preserve